Sy Montgomery (born February 7, 1958 in Frankfurt, Germany, where her father was serving in the U.S. Army) is an American  naturalist, author and scriptwriter who writes for children as well as adults. She is author of 34 books, including The Soul of an Octopus: A Surprising Exploration into the Wonder of Consciousness, which was a finalist for the 2015 National Book Award for Nonfiction and was on The New York Times Best Seller list. Her popular book The Good Good Pig, is the international bestselling memoir of life with her pig, Christopher Hogwood. National best sellers listed on The New York Times Best Seller list include How To Be A Good Creature: A Memoir in 13 Animals, and Becoming A Good Creature (A picture book for children).  Other notable titles include Journey of the Pink Dolphins, Spell of the Tiger, and Search for the Golden Moon Bear. Her book for children, Quest for the Tree Kangaroo: An Expedition to the Cloud Forest of New Guinea was the recipient of the 2007 Orbis Pictus Award and was selected as an Honor book for the Sibert Medal. Her book Kakapo Rescue: Saving The World's Strangest Parrot  won the Sibert Medal in 2010. She is the winner of the 2009 New England Independent Booksellers Association Nonfiction Award, the 2010 Children’s Book Guild Nonfiction Award, the Henry Bergh Award for Nonfiction (given by the ASPCA for Humane Education) and dozens of other honors.

For a half-hour National Geographic segment, she scripted and appeared in Spell of the Tiger, based on her book of the same title. Also for National Geographic, she developed and scripted Mother Bear Man based on the work of Ben Kilham, who raises and releases orphaned American black bears, which won a Chris Award.

  
Author Vicki Croke asked Sy what she has learned, not just about an animal’s natural history, but lessons about life. Sy answered: “How to be a good creature. How do you be compassionate?… I think that animals teach compassion better than anything else and compassion doesn’t necessarily just mean a little mouse with a sore foot and you try to fix it. It means getting yourself inside the mind and heart of someone else. Seeing someone’s soul, looking for their truth. Animals teach you all of that and that’s how you get compassion and heart.”

Early life and education 
Montgomery was born on February 7, 1958, in Frankfurt, Germany. As a child she lived in Frankfurt, Germany; Brooklyn, New York; Alexandria, Virginia; and Westfield, New Jersey. She is a 1975 graduate of Westfield High School and a 1979 graduate of Syracuse University, a triple major with dual degrees in magazine journalism from the S.I. Newhouse School of Public Communications and in French language and literature and in psychology from the College of Arts and Sciences. She has been awarded three honorary doctorate degrees: an honorary Doctorate of Humane Letters from Keene State College in 2004 and an honorary Doctorate of Humane Letters from both Franklin Pierce University and Southern New Hampshire University in 2011.

Personal life 
She lives in Hancock, New Hampshire with her husband, writer Howard Mansfield.

Awards and honors
 2021 Sarah Josepha Hale Award ( to a new England Author for "a distinguished body of work in the field of literature and Letters").
 2021 Named a Literary Light by the Associates of the Boston Public Library.
 2019 Earthwatch International Travel fellowship to join the Tracking Wild Dogs expedition.
 2019 Winner of the John Burroughs Association Riverby Award for Magnificent Migrations: On Safari with African's Last Great Herds. 
 2018 New York Times bestseller for How to Be a Good Creature. 
 2017 Thoreau Prize, granted to "an accomplished writer who embodies the spirit of Thoreau."
 2016 New England Independent Booksellers Association New England Book Award for Nonfiction.
 2016 American Association for the Advancement of Science / Subaru SB&F Winning Middle Grades Science Book
 2015 National Book Award for Nonfiction finalist for The Soul of an Octopus
 New England Independent Booksellers Association, Nonfiction award (lifetime achievement)
 ASPCA Henry Bergh Award for Nonfiction (lifetime achievement)
 2013 American Association for the Advancement of Science Science Book and Film Award for children's nonfiction, Temple Grandin: How the Woman Who Loved Cows Embraced Autism and Changed the World
 2010 The Washington Post/Children's Book Guild Award for Nonfiction
 2011 Sibert Medal winner for Kakapo Rescue

List of works 
For adults:
 1991, The Curious Naturalist: Nature's Everyday Mysteries
 1995, Seasons of the Wild
 1995, Spell of the Tiger: The Man-eaters of the Sunderbans
 2000, Journey of the Pink Dolphins: An Amazon quest
 2000, Walking with the Great Apes
 2002, Search for the Golden Moon Bear: Science and Adventure in Pursuit of a New Species
 2007, The Good Good Pig: The Extraordinary Life of Christopher Hogwood
 2010, Birdology
 2012, The Wild out of Your Window
 2015, The Soul of an Octopus: A Surprising Exploration into the Wonder of Consciousness  
 2018, How to Be a Good Creature: A Memoir in Thirteen Animals (A New York Times bestseller)
 2021, The Hummingbirds' Gift: Wonder, Beauty, and Renewal on Wings
 2022, The Hawk's Way: Encounters with Fierce Beauty

For children:
 1999, The Snake Scientist
 2001, The Man-Eating Tigers of Sundarbans
 2002, Encantado: Pink Dolphin of the Amazon
 2004, The Tarantula Scientist
 2006, Quest for the Tree Kangaroo: An Expedition to the Cloud Forest of New Guinea
 2009, Saving the Ghost of the Mountain: An Expedition among Snow Leopards in Mongolia
 2010, Kakapo Rescue: Saving the World's Strangest Parrot
 2012, Temple Grandin: How the Girl Who Loved Cows Embraced Autism and Changed the World
 2013, Snowball the Dancing Cockatoo
 2013, The Tapir Scientist:  Saving South America's Largest Mammal
 2014, Chasing Cheetahs:  The Race to Save Africa's Fastest Cat
 2015, The Octopus Scientists: Exploring the Mind of a Mollusk
 2016, The Great White Shark Scientist
 2017, Amazon Adventure
 2018, The Hyena Scientist
 2018, Inky's Amazing Escape: How a Very Smart Octopus Found His Way Home
 2019, The Magnificent Migration: On Safari With Africa's last Great herds
 2020, Becoming A Good Creature
 2020, Condor Comeback
 2022, The Seagull And The Sea Captain

References

External links

 

1958 births
American animal welfare scholars
American children's writers
American naturalists
American nature writers
Animal cognition writers
Living people
People from Hancock, New Hampshire
People from Westfield, New Jersey
Syracuse University alumni
Westfield High School (New Jersey) alumni
Robert F. Sibert Informational Book Medal winners